William Rigby (9 June 1921 – 1 June 2010) was an English footballer who played as a goalkeeper. He was born in Chester.

A product of the youth system at his hometown club of Chester, Rigby made his only peacetime first-team appearance for the club in their first post-war match in The Football League in a 4–4 draw at York City on 31 August 1946. After this he was not selected again, with goalkeeping duties being passed on to George Scales and Jimmy MacLaren.

Earlier he had made appearances for the first-team during the war years, mainly during 1940–41 and 1941–42 while understudy to Bill Shortt.

Bibliography

References

1921 births
2010 deaths
Sportspeople from Chester
English Football League players
Association football goalkeepers
English footballers
Chester City F.C. players